Andre Anderson (1890 in Chicago, Illinois – April 1, 1926) was an American boxer from 1915 until his death in 1926. He was best known for knocking down and drawing the World Heavyweight Champion Jack Dempsey on 24 June 1916 in a match held in the Bronx, New York.

It was alleged that Anderson would take dives for organized crime gamblers, which led to his shooting death, reportedly after refusing to partake in further bribes.

Hemingway connection

Because of proximity (Chicago), profession and death at the hands of the mob, the young writer Ernest Hemingway was almost certainly aware of Anderson. Hemingway likely used him as the basis for Andreson 'the Swede' in his short stories 'A Matter of Colour' and 'The Killers'.

References

External links
 Anderson's Record at Cyber Boxing Zone

1890 births
1926 deaths
Boxers from Chicago
Heavyweight boxers
American male boxers
People murdered by American organized crime